Charles Hammond (31 August 1868 – 25 September 1955) was an Australian cricketer. He played two first-class matches for Tasmania between 1898 and 1900.

See also
 List of Tasmanian representative cricketers

References

External links
 

1868 births
1955 deaths
Australian cricketers
Tasmania cricketers
Cricketers from Hobart